Sara Winifred Brown (1868–1948) was a prominent African American teacher and doctor. She worked in disaster relief and gynecology. In 1910, she helped to found the group that would later become the National Association of University Women, and in 1924 was the first woman to serve as an alumni trustee of Howard University.

Early life
Sara Winifred Brown was born in Winchester, Virginia.

Education
Brown attended Hampton University, then called Hampton Normal and Agriculture Institute, graduating with honors. She taught English in Washington, D.C., then took a leave of absence to attend Cornell University in 1894. At Cornell, she would become the first African American to graduate from the University.

.  She lived at Sage College dormitory, which three decades later changed its policy and barred residency to women of color. At Cornell, she became interested in biology, graduating with a BS in biology in 1897. She returned to DC and taught biology. She then enrolled in Howard University, receiving her MD in 1904.

Career and family
After receiving her MD from Howard, she entered medical practice but continued to pursue her educational interests in sociology and anthropology. In 1908, Howard University hired her to lecture on gynecology, and she continued to practice medicine and teach high school biology. In 1910, she joined in the founding of the College Alumnae Club, which came to be called the National Association of College Women, and is now known as the National Association of University Women. During World War I, she was one of 50 women chosen by the Women's War Work Council to be part of the "Flying Squadron". In 1924, she was elected to the board of Howard University, the first woman to serve as an alumni trustee. In 1927, she joined a Red Cross relief effort to assist victims of severe flooding in Mississippi and Louisiana. In 1930, she joined a Gold Star Mothers pilgrimage to France. She was struck by a bus in 1948 and died as a result of her injuries.

Legacy
The United States Department of Health and Human Services lists her as an African American Pioneer in Health Care. In the 1950s, her brother, Dr. John William Brown, donated $40,000 to Howard University, which renamed their Friendship Clinic to the Sara Winifred Brown Memorial Clinic. In 2010, as part of their Centennial celebration, the National Association of University Women planted a tree and placed a plaque to honor her founding efforts.

References

Howard University alumni
1868 births
1948 deaths
Cornell University alumni
20th-century American physicians
20th-century American women physicians
Physicians from Virginia
20th-century African-American women
20th-century African-American people
20th-century African-American physicians
Road incident deaths in the United States